Karin Burger (born 12 April 1993) is a New Zealand netball international. She was a member of the New Zealand teams that won the 2019 Netball World Cup and the 2021 Constellation Cup. Burger has also played for both Central Pulse and
Mainland Tactix in the ANZ Premiership. She was a member of the Pulse teams that won 2019 and 2020 ANZ Premiership titles. While playing for Tactix, she was named 2021 ANZ Premiership Player of the Year.

Early life and family
Burger was born and raised in South Africa. Her family home is in Vredendal, Western Cape. She is daughter of Alma and Gerrit Burger. She has a sister, Almarie, and a brother Gerrit Junior. Burger started playing netball aged 6. In her youth, she greatly admired Irene van Dyk and Leana de Bruin. At aged 18, she made the decision to move to Wellington, New Zealand to pursue a netball career.

Playing career

Naenae Collegians United
Burger began her New Zealand netball career with Naenae Collegians United in Lower Hutt. She played for NNCU in Hutt Valley club netball competitions. While playing for Central Pulse, Burger continued to coach and mentor at NNCU.

Central Zone
In 2016 and 2017, Burger played for Central Zone in the Beko Netball League. Her team mates included Tiana Metuarau and Kimiora Poi. In 2016 she was a member of the Central Zone team that finished the season as runners up to Netball South. She was subsequently named the 2016 Beko Netball League Player of the Year. In 2017 she was a member of the Central Zone team that won the title. In the grand final they defeated Hellers Netball Mainland 43–41 and Burger was named player of the match.

Central Pulse
Between 2017 and 2020, Burger played for Central Pulse in the ANZ Premiership. 
After impressing in the Beko Netball League, Burger was invited by Yvette McCausland-Durie to join the Pulse squad for 2017. However, her court time was  limited in her first season with Katrina Grant being the first chose goal defender. She switched to wing defence for 2018 and went on to establish herself as a regular member of the team. She was subsequently a member of the Pulse teams that won 2019 and 2020 titles. Along the way, between 2018 and 2019, Burger played in three successive grand finals for Pulse.

Mainland Tactix
In September 2020, Burger switched from Central Pulse to Mainland Tactix. The move to Tactix gave her the opportunity to play at goal defence and to partner with her New Zealand team mate, Jane Watson. She subsequently enjoyed a stand out season and was named the  
2021 ANZ Premiership Player of the Year.

New Zealand
Burger made her senior debut for New Zealand on 15 September 2018 against England during the September 2018 Netball Quad Series. It was a debut that was memorable for the wrong reasons, as she was sent off the court. She was a prominent member of the New Zealand team that won the 2019 Netball World Cup. She was also a member of the New Zealand team that won the 2021 Constellation Cup. Burger had to pull out of trials for the 2022 Commonwealth Games due to a navicular fracture in her foot.

Statistics

Grand finals

ANZ Premiership

|- style="background-color: #eaeaea"
! scope="row" style="text-align:center" | 2017
|style="text-align:center;"|Pulse
|0/0||?||4||?||?||5||7||27||3||10 
|- 
! scope="row" style="text-align:center" | 2018
|style="text-align:center;"|Pulse
|0/0||?||1||?||?||28||37||172||25||16  
|- style="background-color: #eaeaea"
! scope="row" style="text-align:center" | 2019
|style="text-align:center;"|Pulse
|0/0||?||2||?||?||41||79||149||27||16 
|- 
! scope="row" style="text-align:center" | 2020
|style="text-align:center;"|Pulse
|0/0||?||0||?||?||22||37||123||21||14 
|- style="background-color: #eaeaea"
! scope="row" style="text-align:center" | 2021
|style="text-align:center;"|Tactix
|0/0||?||27||142||?||48||69||189||29||17 
|- 
! scope="row" style="text-align:center" | 2022
|style="text-align:center;"|Tactix
|0/0|| ||  || || || || || || || 
|- class="sortbottom"
! colspan=2| Career
! 
! 
! 
! 
! 
! 
! 
! 
! 
! 
|}

Honours
New Zealand
Netball World Cup
Winners: 2019
Constellation Cup
Winners: 2021 
Taini Jamison Trophy
Winners: 2020
Fast5 Netball World Series
Winners: 2018
Central Pulse
ANZ Premiership
Winners: 2019, 2020
Runners up: 2017, 2018
Netball New Zealand Super Club
Winners: 2018
Mainland Tactix
ANZ Premiership
Runners up: 2021
Central Zone
Beko Netball League
Winners: 2017
Runners up: 2016

Individual Awards

References

1993 births
Living people
New Zealand netball players
New Zealand international netball players
New Zealand international Fast5 players
2019 Netball World Cup players
National Netball League (New Zealand) players
Central Manawa players
ANZ Premiership players
Central Pulse players
Mainland Tactix players
New Zealand netball coaches
South African netball players
South African expatriate netball people in New Zealand
Sportspeople from the Western Cape